Norrländska Mästerskapet was a Swedish football cup held to decide the Champions of Norrland. As teams from a large part of northern Sweden, approximately above the province of Medelpad, were not allowed to play in the Swedish league system until the 1952–53 season, the best team from the region was instead decided by this tournament, which was played between 1925 and 1953.

Previous winners

Cup champions

External links
Sveriges fotbollshistoriker och statistiker - Statistik

Defunct football competitions in Sweden